Newblock Park is part of Tulsa Parks municipal parks system. It is located in northwest Tulsa, Oklahoma at 1710 Charles Page Blvd. The park, which opened in 1927, was named for Herman F. Newblock, who served four terms (1922 – 1928 and 1932 – 1934) as mayor of Tulsa.

Historical background
The site now occupied by the park was originally used for a water filtration plant by the Tulsa Water Department in the early 20th century. Its purpose was to remove silt from Arkansas River water, which was then piped to users in Tulsa. The filtration plant was unable to meet the design requirements and was abandoned in 1918. Tulsa then selected the Spavinaw Water Project to provide water for the city. In 1923, the Arkansas River flooded the original treatment plant. The original 1910 brick building has been converted to the WaterWorks Art Center.

See also
Newblock Park Trail Map

New Block Swimming Pool had double pools (Shallow and Deep/both Olympic Size) At that time, this pool was the largest concrete pool in Oklahoma. It had a 10-foot diving board and a low board, tall life guard towers, and a slanted wood "board walk" for sunbathing. The building had a recreation area, huge entry area, large dressing rooms.

References

Parks in Oklahoma
Sports in Tulsa, Oklahoma
Protected areas of Tulsa County, Oklahoma
Tourist attractions in Tulsa, Oklahoma